Narciso Campero is a province in the Cochabamba Department, Bolivia. Its capital is Aiquile. Aiquile lies on one transportation route between the cities of Cochabamba, Sucre and Santa Cruz.

Subdivision 
The province is divided into three municipalities which are further subdivided into cantons.

1998 earthquake 

Campero was near the epicenter of an earthquake which struck on May 22, 1998. The shock had a moment magnitude of 6.6 and a maximum Mercalli intensity of VIII (Severe). It caused over 100 deaths and left thousands homeless. It was the largest shallow earthquake in Bolivia in over 50 years, and was felt as far away as Cochabamba and Sucre (approximately 100 km). The earthquake caused widespread damage over an area of approximately 100 km in diameter. The major towns affected were Hoyadas (100% of the buildings destroyed), Aiquile (75% of the buildings destroyed) and Totora (70% of the buildings destroyed).

See also 
 Chhijmuri

Notes

External links 
 Map of Narciso Campero Province

Provinces of Cochabamba Department